Warsaw Uprising Square (Polish: Plac Powstańców Warszawy), still popularly known by its former name Napoleon Square (Polish: Plac Napoleona), is a square in the central Warsaw district of Śródmieście.

Overview
Located at the junction of ulica Świętokrzyska (Holy Cross Street) and ulica Szpitalna  (Hospital Street), and near Nowy Świat (New World Street), it is one of Warsaw's central squares. Historically, the area was called Plac Warecki during the times of the Polish–Lithuanian Commonwealth and then Plac Napoleona under the Second Polish Republic. Most of the Square's buildings were destroyed in the 1944 Warsaw Uprising, and the Square is now notable for only two landmarks: the seat of the Polish National Bank (which Varsovians irreverently call  "trumna" — "the coffin"), and the former Prudential building, which was the second skyscraper to be built in Warsaw and the tallest until the 1950s.

References

Squares in Warsaw
Śródmieście, Warsaw